This is a list of electoral results for the electoral district of Maiwar in Queensland state elections.

Members for Maiwar

Election results

Elections in the 2020s

Elections in the 2010s

References

Maiwar